The following outline is provided as an overview of and topical guide to Costa Rica:

Costa Rica – sovereign country located in Central America, bordered by Nicaragua to the north, Panama to the east-southeast, the Pacific Ocean to the west and south, and the Caribbean Sea to the east.  Costa Rica was the first country in the world to constitutionally abolish its army.  Among Latin American countries, Costa Rica ranks 4th on the 2007 Human Development Index, and 48th worldwide.  Costa Rica is ranked 5th in the world on the 2008 Environmental Performance Index, up from the 15th place in 2006. In 2007 the government stated that it wants Costa Rica to be the first country to become carbon neutral by 2021.

General reference

 Pronunciation:
 Common English country name: Costa Rica
 Official English country name: The Republic of Costa Rica
 Common endonym(s): Tiquicia
 Official endonym(s):  
 Adjectival(s): Costa Rican
 Demonym(s):
 Etymology: Name of Costa Rica
 International rankings of Costa Rica
 ISO country codes: CR, CRI, 188
 ISO region codes: See ISO 3166-2:CR
 Internet country code top-level domain: .cr

Geography of Costa Rica 

Geography of Costa Rica
 Costa Rica is: a country
 Location:
 Northern Hemisphere and Western Hemisphere
 Americas
 North America
 Middle America
 Central America
 Time zone:  UTC-06
 Extreme points of Costa Rica
 High:  Cerro Chirripó 
 Low:  North Pacific Ocean and Caribbean Sea 0 m
Land boundaries:  639 km
 330 km
 309 km
 Coastline:  1,290 km
 Population of Costa Rica: 4,301,712 (2011 census)  - 123rd most populous country

 Area of Costa Rica: 51,100 km2
 Atlas of Costa Rica

Environment of Costa Rica 

 Climate of Costa Rica
 Deforestation in Costa Rica
 Ecoregions in Costa Rica
 Renewable energy in Costa Rica
 Geology of Costa Rica
 Protected areas of Costa Rica
 Biosphere reserves in Costa Rica
 National parks of Costa Rica
 Wildlife of Costa Rica
 Fauna of Costa Rica
 Birds of Costa Rica
 Mammals of Costa Rica
 Monkeys of Costa Rica

Natural geographic features of Costa Rica 

 Fjords of Costa Rica
 Glaciers of Costa Rica
 Islands of Costa Rica
 Lakes of Costa Rica
 Mountains of Costa Rica
 Volcanoes in Costa Rica
 Rivers of Costa Rica
 Waterfalls of Costa Rica
 Valleys of Costa Rica
 World Heritage Sites in Costa Rica

Regions of Costa Rica 

Regions of Costa Rica

Ecoregions of Costa Rica 

List of ecoregions in Costa Rica
Neotropical tropical and subtropical moist broadleaf forests
Central American Atlantic moist forests
Cocos Island moist forests
Costa Rican seasonal moist forests
Isthmian–Atlantic moist forests
Isthmian–Pacific moist forests
Talamancan montane forests
Neotropical Tropical and subtropical dry broadleaf forests
Central American dry forests
Neotropical Montane grasslands and shrublands
Talamanca Paramo
Neotropical Mangrove
Bocas del Toro–San Bastimentos Island–San Blas mangroves
Moist Pacific Coast mangroves
Mosquitia–Nicaraguan Caribbean Coast mangroves
Rio Negro–Rio San Sun mangroves
Southern Dry Pacific Coast mangroves

Administrative divisions of Costa Rica 

Administrative divisions of Costa Rica
 Provinces of Costa Rica
 Cantons of Costa Rica
 Districts of Costa Rica

Provinces of Costa Rica 

Provinces of Costa Rica

Cantons of Costa Rica 

Districts of Costa Rica

Districts of Costa Rica 

Districts of Costa Rica

Municipalities of Costa Rica 

 Capital of Costa Rica: San José
 Cantons of Costa Rica

Demography of Costa Rica 

Demographics of Costa Rica

Government and politics of Costa Rica 

Politics of Costa Rica
 Form of government: presidential representative democratic republic
 Capital of Costa Rica: San José
 Elections in Costa Rica
 Political parties in Costa Rica

Branches of government

Government of Costa Rica

Executive branch of the government of Costa Rica 
 Head of state: President of Costa Rica
 Head of government: Prime Minister of Costa Rica
 Cabinet of Costa Rica

Legislative branch of the government of Costa Rica 

 Parliament of Costa Rica (unicameral)

Judicial branch of the government of Costa Rica 

Court system of Costa Rica
 Supreme Court of Costa Rica

Foreign relations of Costa Rica 

Foreign relations of Costa Rica
 Diplomatic missions in Costa Rica
 Diplomatic missions of Costa Rica

International organization membership 
The Republic of Costa Rica is a member of:

Agency for the Prohibition of Nuclear Weapons in Latin America and the Caribbean (OPANAL)
Central American Bank for Economic Integration (BCIE)
Central American Common Market (CACM)
Central American Integration System (SICA)
Food and Agriculture Organization (FAO)
Group of 77 (G77)
Inter-American Development Bank (IADB)
Inter-Parliamentary Union (IPU)
International Atomic Energy Agency (IAEA)
International Bank for Reconstruction and Development (IBRD)
International Chamber of Commerce (ICC)
International Civil Aviation Organization (ICAO)
International Criminal Court (ICCt)
International Criminal Police Organization (Interpol)
International Development Association (IDA)
International Federation of Red Cross and Red Crescent Societies (IFRCS)
International Finance Corporation (IFC)
International Fund for Agricultural Development (IFAD)
International Labour Organization (ILO)
International Maritime Organization (IMO)
International Mobile Satellite Organization (IMSO)
International Monetary Fund (IMF)
International Olympic Committee (IOC)
International Organization for Migration (IOM)
International Organization for Standardization (ISO)
International Red Cross and Red Crescent Movement (ICRM)

International Telecommunication Union (ITU)
International Telecommunications Satellite Organization (ITSO)
International Trade Union Confederation (ITUC)
Latin American Economic System (LAES)
Latin American Integration Association (LAIA) (observer)
Multilateral Investment Guarantee Agency (MIGA)
Nonaligned Movement (NAM) (observer)
Organisation for the Prohibition of Chemical Weapons (OPCW)
Organization of American States (OAS)
Permanent Court of Arbitration (PCA)
Rio Group (RG)
Unión Latina
United Nations (UN)
United Nations Conference on Trade and Development (UNCTAD)
United Nations Educational, Scientific, and Cultural Organization (UNESCO)
United Nations High Commissioner for Refugees (UNHCR)
United Nations Industrial Development Organization (UNIDO)
Universal Postal Union (UPU)
World Confederation of Labour (WCL)
World Customs Organization (WCO)
World Federation of Trade Unions (WFTU)
World Health Organization (WHO)
World Intellectual Property Organization (WIPO)
World Meteorological Organization (WMO)
World Tourism Organization (UNWTO)
World Trade Organization (WTO)

Law and order in Costa Rica 

Law of Costa Rica
 Constitution of Costa Rica
 Crime in Costa Rica
 Human rights in Costa Rica
 LGBT rights in Costa Rica
 Freedom of religion in Costa Rica
 Law enforcement in Costa Rica

Military of Costa Rica 

Military of Costa Rica
 Command
 Commander-in-chief
 Ministry of Defence of Costa Rica
 Forces
 Army of Costa Rica
 Navy of Costa Rica
 Air Force of Costa Rica
 Special forces of Costa Rica
 Military history of Costa Rica
 Military ranks of Costa Rica

Local government in Costa Rica 

Local government in Costa Rica

History of Costa Rica 

History of Costa Rica
Timeline of the history of Costa Rica
Current events of Costa Rica
 Military history of Costa Rica

Culture of Costa Rica 

Culture of Costa Rica
 Architecture of Costa Rica
 Costa Rican people
 Cuisine of Costa Rica
 Festivals in Costa Rica
 Languages of Costa Rica
 Media in Costa Rica
 Museums in Costa Rica
 National symbols of Costa Rica
 Coat of arms of Costa Rica
 Flag of Costa Rica
 National anthem of Costa Rica
 Prostitution in Costa Rica
 Public holidays in Costa Rica
 Records of Costa Rica
 Religion in Costa Rica
 Buddhism in Costa Rica
 Christianity in Costa Rica
 Hinduism in Costa Rica
 Islam in Costa Rica
 Judaism in Costa Rica
 Sikhism in Costa Rica
 World Heritage Sites in Costa Rica

Art in Costa Rica 
 Art in Costa Rica
 Cinema of Costa Rica
 Literature of Costa Rica
 Music of Costa Rica
 Television in Costa Rica
 Theatre in Costa Rica

Sports in Costa Rica 

Sports in Costa Rica
 Football in Costa Rica
 Costa Rica at the Olympics

Economy and infrastructure of Costa Rica 

Economy of Costa Rica
 Economic rank, by nominal GDP (2007): 84th (eighty-fourth)
 Agriculture in Costa Rica
 Banking in Costa Rica
 National Bank of Costa Rica
 Communications in Costa Rica
 Internet in Costa Rica
 Companies of Costa Rica
Currency of Costa Rica: Colón
ISO 4217: CRC
 Health care in Costa Rica
 Costa Rica Stock Exchange
 Tourism in Costa Rica
 Transport in Costa Rica
 Airports in Costa Rica
 Rail transport in Costa Rica
 Roads in Costa Rica
 Water supply and sanitation in Costa Rica

See also

Costa Rica

Index of Costa Rica-related articles
List of Costa Rica-related topics
List of international rankings
Member state of the United Nations
Outline of Central America
Outline of geography
Outline of North America

References

External links

Costa Rica